Norbert Hans Poehlke (15 September 1951 – 22 October 1985), The Hammer-Killer (Der Hammermörder), was a German police officer (1971–1985) and serial killer who after he committed suicide in 1985 was found to have committed several bank robberies and related murders. He was tagged as the "Hammer-Killer" for his modus operandi of killing drivers of cars and using a sledgehammer in later bank robberies in which he would use his victims' cars as getaway vehicles.

Early life 
Poehlke was a police officer in Baden-Württemberg, employed from 1982 as a high-ranking sergeant of Mühlhausen am Neckar's canine division. After winning 36,000 Deutsche Mark from the lottery, he built a house for his family (consisting of his wife, two sons and a daughter) in the village of Strümpfelbach in Backnang, where he took care of the finances. After the construction of the family home, the family became heavily indebted. In March 1984, his daughter Cordula died from a brain tumor at the age of three.

Shortly thereafter, he began a series of robberies and bank robberies, three of which proceeded in the same pattern: First, he lured a random victim in a remote rest area to get into his vehicle. He killed his victims with his service weapon, a Walther P5, by shooting them in the head. After the crime, he would drive with the stolen vehicle to a bank to rob them. Masked, he smashed the windows of the ticket counter with a sledgehammer, robbed cash, and then escaped with the other vehicle.

The series of murders displaced the residents of Heilbronn-Ludwigsburg for more than a year. The unknown perpetrator was soon dubbed in the media as the "Hammer-Killer", although the sledgehammer was not his preferred murder tool.

The crimes 
On 3 May 1984, 47-year-old engineer and commercial traveler Siegfried Pfitzer from Aschaffenburg was found dead, shot in the head, at a highway rest stop in Marbach, West Germany. His car, found a quarter-mile from his body, was linked to a bank robbery the same day in Erbstetten. The assailant had smashed the teller window with a sledgehammer, and taken the money on the other side. Despite extensive police investigations, the initial search for the perpetrator was unsuccessful.

On 21 December, 37-year-old Eugene Wethey, an English expatriate living in Nuremberg, was found shot dead in a rest stop near Grossbottwar. A week later, Wethey's car was used in a bank robbery in Cleebronn by a man wielding a sledgehammer.

On 22 July 1985, 26-year-old Wilfried Scheider was found shot dead in a parking lot in Beilstein-Schmidhausen. He was shot with a Walther P5 pistol, a common police issue pistol. The victim's car was found at the scene of a bank robbery in Spiegelberg.

Investigation 
The subsequently formed SOKO "Hammer", whose headquarters were in the Bottwar school center, led the largest operation in West Germany's post-war period. In the next four months, 540 clues were investigated and 1,400 people questioned.

On 5 July 1985, the lead police station in Stuttgart publicly announced on the Aktenzeichen XY… ungelöst program that they requested help from viewers. After the show, in which a movie was used to reconstruct the previous murders and raids, the criminal police did not receive any decisive information from the public. It is believed that Poehlke's wife had seen the broadcast.

On 29 September 1985, while searching a Ludwigsburg railway station for bombs, anti-terrorist officers found a police uniform in one of the lockers. The uniform was traced to detective chief superintendent Norbert Poehlke, a veteran officer of 14 years in Stuttgart. Poehlke said it had been left there after a quick change for a family member's funeral. Police became suspicious when they discovered no recent family deaths, but that his daughter had died of cancer in 1984.

The investigation was picking up when, on 14 October, Poehlke requested, and got, some sick leave. Several days later police went to his home to ask him some questions regarding the murders and robberies. With no one answering, and fearing Poelhke had fled, the police entered the house. What they found was Poelhke's wife shot twice in the head in the bathroom and in one of the bedrooms was his son Adrian, also shot dead.

Three days later, on 23 October, Poehlke and his other son, Gabriel, were found shot dead, a clear murder-suicide, in his car at Torre Canne, a village near Brindisi, Italy. Poehlke's pistol was confirmed as the murder weapon in the murders, and the case was closed.

In the media 
Prominent German screenwriter Fred Breinersdorfer, together with Elke R. Evert, wrote a book titled The Hammer Murderer in 1986. A documentary novel was also written, and a play based on the case was made in 1989. A feature film , starring Christian Redl and Ulrike Kriener in the lead roles, was broadcast on ZDF in 1990 and won the Grimme-Preis Award the following year.

In 1999, the German TV series Die Cleveren broadcast an episode titled "Greed", leaning on details from the Poehlke case; these include, for example, the killer's modus operandi being stealing vehicles and the main suspect being an investigating officer.

In 2001, the ARD broadcast a documentary about the Poehlke case under the title The Hammer-Killer - blood trail of a police officer in the 'Die großen Kriminalfälle series, which reconstructed the case based on investigation files and numerous witness accounts.

See also
 List of German serial killers

References

Bibliography 
 Fuchs, Christian [1996] (2002). Bad Blood: An Illustrated Guide to Psycho Cinema. Creation Books. 
 Wetsch, Elisabeth. POEHLKE, Norbert Hans Serial Killers True Crime Library. Retrieved on 2007-10-03
 Fred Breinersdorfer, Elke R. Evert: The Hammer Killer. A documentary novel. Factor publishing house, Stuttgart 1986, 
 Martin Jung: "The Hammer Killer" - Police master Norbert Poehlke. In: Klaus Schönberger (ed.): Vabanque. Bank robbery, theory, practice, history. Berlin/Göttingen 2000,

External links 
 Norbert Poehlke killed six people 30 years ago. (Stuttgarter Zeitung online, retrieved on October 20, 2015)
 Lane 3799: Right track, wrong grid. In: Der Spiegel. No.  17 , 1986, pp. 53–60
 Fred Breinersdorfer, Anne Worst: The Hammer Killer - Bloodstain of a Policeman. The First of May 24, 2001 (WH April 23, 2013 SWR, 3sat) on YouTube
 The case of the hammer murderer in the Landesarchiv Baden-Württemberg

1951 births
1985 deaths
1985 suicides
Familicides
German police officers
German serial killers
Male serial killers
Murder–suicides in Europe
People from Stuttgart
Police misconduct in Germany
Serial killers who worked in law enforcement
Suicides by firearm in Italy